Sagittarius B2 (Sgr B2) is a giant molecular cloud of gas and dust that is located about  from the center of the Milky Way. The total mass of Sgr B2 is about 3 million times the mass of the Sun. The mean hydrogen density within the cloud is 3000 atoms per cm3, which is about 20–40 times denser than a typical molecular cloud.

The internal structure of this cloud is complex, with varying densities and temperatures. The cloud is divided into three main cores, designated north (N), middle or main (M) and south (S) respectively. Thus Sgr B2(N) represents the north core. The sites Sgr B2(M) and Sgr B2(N) are sites of prolific star formation. The first 10 H II regions discovered were designated A through J. H II regions A–G, I and J lie within Sgr B2(M), while region K is in Sgr B2(N) and region H is in Sgr B2(S). The 5-parsec-wide core of the cloud is a star-forming region that is emitting about 10 million times the luminosity of the Sun.

The cloud is composed of various kinds of complex molecules, of particular interest: alcohol. The cloud contains ethanol, vinyl alcohol, and methanol. This is due to the conglomeration of atoms resulting in new molecules. The composition was discovered via spectrograph in an attempt to discover amino acids. An ester, ethyl formate, was also discovered, which is a major precursor to amino acids. This ester is also responsible for the flavour of raspberries, leading some articles on Sagittarius B2 to postulate the cloud as smelling of ‘raspberry rum’. Large quantities of butyronitrile (propyl cyanide) and other alkyl cyanides have also been detected as being present in the cloud.

Because the average temperature and pressure in Sgr B2 are low, chemistry based on the direct interaction of atoms is exceedingly slow. However, the Sgr B2 complex contains cold dust grains consisting of a silicon core surrounded by a mantle of water ice and various carbon compounds. The surfaces of these grains allow chemical reactions to occur by accreting molecules that can then interact with neighboring compounds. The resulting compounds can then evaporate from the surface and join the molecular cloud.

The molecular components of this cloud can be readily observed in the 102–103 μm range of wavelengths.  About half of all the known interstellar molecules were first found near Sgr B2, and nearly every other currently known molecule has since been detected in this feature.

The European Space Agency's gamma-ray observatory INTEGRAL has observed gamma rays interacting with Sgr B2, causing X-ray emission from the molecular cloud. This energy was emitted about 350 years ago by the supermassive black hole (SMBH) at the galaxy's core, Sagittarius A*. The total luminosity from this outburst is an estimated million times stronger than the current output from Sagittarius A*. This conclusion has been supported in 2011 by Japanese astronomers who observed the galactic center with the Suzaku satellite.

See also

 Large Molecule Heimat
 List of molecules in interstellar space

References

External links

 How Did Organic Matter Reach Earth? Cosmic Detectives Trace Origin of Complex Organic Molecules, on: SciTechDaily. September 10, 2020. Source: Tokyo University of Science: Acetonitrile found in molecular cloud Sgr B2(M) at the center of our galaxy.

Molecular clouds
Milky Way
Sagittarius (constellation)